Randy Michael Rahe (born June 12, 1960) is an American college basketball coach and the former head men's basketball coach at Weber State University. Randy Rahe was hired on March 23, 2006, as the 9th coach in Weber State's 47-year history.  Rahe announced his retirement May 16, 2022 through the University, Rahe came to WSU from the University of Utah where he was an assistant under former coach Ray Giacoletti. Rahe was also an assistant under Stew Morrill for 13 seasons, first at Colorado State University and then at Utah State University. Rahe posted a record of 54–17 as a high school coach in Colorado from 1985 to 1988. He has also been an assistant coach at Colorado College, Colorado and Denver.

Born in Bancroft, Iowa, Rahe graduated from Buena Vista University located in Storm Lake, Iowa in 1982. At BVU he played point guard in basketball and shortstop in baseball.

After completing 6 seasons at Weber State, Rahe has had many accolades: 4 Big Sky Conference MVP players, 5 Post-season tournament appearances, 6 Big Sky post-season tournament appearances, 8 Big Sky All-Conference 1st team performers, 18 Big Sky All-Conference performers, 18 Big Sky Academic All-Conference members, 20 or more wins in four seasons, and a 76% winning percentage in Big Sky games. Rahe also coached Damian Lillard who was drafted #6 in the 1st round of the 2012 NBA Draft.

In June 2016, Rahe signed a contract extension good until the 2023-24 season.

On February 13, 2016 vs Portland State, Rahe recorded both his 200th total win and 124th Big Sky Conference win, the latter breaking the Big Sky record previously held by Mick Durham of Montana State. On February 17, 2018 against Sacramento State, Rahe broke Durham's record of most total wins by a Big Sky coach with his 247th win.

Head coaching record

References

External links
 Weber State profile

1960 births
Living people
American men's basketball coaches
American men's basketball players
Baseball players from Iowa
Baseball shortstops
Basketball coaches from Iowa
Basketball players from Iowa
Buena Vista Beavers baseball players
Buena Vista Beavers men's basketball players
College men's basketball head coaches in the United States
Colorado Buffaloes men's basketball coaches
Colorado College Tigers men's basketball coaches
Colorado State Rams men's basketball coaches
Denver Pioneers men's basketball coaches
High school basketball coaches in the United States
People from Kossuth County, Iowa
Point guards
Utah State Aggies men's basketball coaches
Utah Utes men's basketball coaches
Weber State Wildcats men's basketball coaches